St. Ann, The Personal School is a Catholic pre-kindergarten and K–8 school in Upper Manhattan, located in East Harlem at 314 East 110th Street, New York City. It was founded in 1926. The principal is Mrs. Teresa Letizia.

References

External links
 

Roman Catholic secondary schools in Manhattan
Roman Catholic elementary schools in Manhattan
Educational institutions established in 1926
1926 establishments in New York (state)